An ecchondroma is a type of chondroma that is subperiosteal. A proliferation  is known as "ecchondrosis".

References

External links 

Benign neoplasms
Osseous and chondromatous neoplasia